was a samurai officer under the Oda clan following Japan's 16th-century Sengoku period, and the older brother of the famous Mori Ranmaru. His wife Ikeda Sen, was the daughter of Ikeda Tsuneoki.

Nagayoshi was known to have such a bad temper and to be particularly ruthless in battle that he came to be known as the "Devil". 
Nagayoshi was gifted with Kaneyama Castle after his father died in battle. While he was under the service of the Oda clan, he was directly under the service of Nobunaga’s eldest son, Oda Nobutada, who fought alongside Nagashima in 1574.

In 1577, Nagayoshi serving Nobutada to occupy Takeda's castles. In 1582, He took Takato Castle in Shinano Province and took Kazu Castle in Kai province. He was given an award of 100, 000 Koku. However, this campaign was forced to stop when his lord Oda Nobunaga died at Honno-ji.

Later, Nagayoshi took Mino Castle with the help of his relatives from the Ikeda clan side of his family.

Nagayoshi's efforts for Toyotomi Hideyoshi during the difficult Battle of Komaki and Nagakute ultimately took his life. During the battle he rode in front of his lines and waved a war fan frantically. He stood out conspicuously wearing a white jinbaori and was subsequently shot in the head by an ashigaru firing a matchlock rifle.  His younger brother Mori Tadamasa became the next clan head.

Family
Father: Mori Yoshinari (1523-1570)
Brothers:
 Mori Ranmaru (1565-1582)
 Mori Tadamasa
Wife: Ikeda Sen

References

Samurai
1558 births
1584 deaths
Japanese warriors killed in battle